Aïn Feka is a small town and commune in Djelfa Province, Algeria. According to the 1998 census it has a population of 16,842. The town lies on the N89 highway.

References

Communes of Djelfa Province